Antonia "Tonia" Coresi (fl. 1655 – fl. 1674) was an Italian opera soprano.

She was a primadonna at the Opera in Venice between 1655 and 1672. She was married to the opera singer Nicola Coresi.

Between 1670 and 1674, she was engaged by Christina, Queen of Sweden in Rome. Queen Christina founded the first public theatre- and opera house, the Teatro Tordinona. The Teatro Tordinona was inaugurated in January 1671 with the opera Scipione Affricano by Francesco Cavalli, with Antonia Coresi as Scipione and Medea, and Angelica Quadrelli as Sofonisba and Isifile. 

The performance was a sensation, because women were formally banned from performing onstage in the city of Rome; and while this ban was overlooked in the private theatres of the nobility, the Teatro Tordinona was meant to be a public theare, albeit in a special position because it was privately owned by the queen. Queen Christina engaged several women to perform: aside from Antonia Coresi and Angelica Quadrelli, she also engaged Maria Landini and Angela Voglia. Teatro Tordinona was however closed in 1674, and the ban on female actors and stage performers was reinforced in 1686.

References 

Year of birth missing
Year of death missing
17th-century Italian women opera singers
17th-century Italian actresses
Italian stage actresses
Court of Christina, Queen of Sweden
Italian operatic sopranos